Bakulari is a village located in Sohagara Panchayat of Guthani Block of Siwan district in the Indian state of Bihar.

Geography 
It is a medium size village which is situated in the westernmost part of the Siwan district with the distance of about 35 km and about 185 km. far from its State Capital, Patna. It is in north-west direction of Guthani Block (Police Station) with a distance of about 7 km. Also the distance from the State-Border of Uttar Pradesh and Bihar is just 4 km from west of it and less than 1 km from south of it. A  famous temple of Lord Shiva (Baba Hansnath) in Sohagara is just about 4 km from this village. On the southern end of the village, there is a very large pond like a lake namely "Bhagra Taal", which is very famous for Lotus (the national flower of India) and fishing at large scale, and also this pond is marked as the 'U.P. - Bihar Border' as it divides the two states here. On the banks of this pond, "Chhath Puja Ghat" is there. The total geographical area of this village is 113 hectares. The internal roads of the village are constructed with fully Plain Cement Concrete (PCC). The nearest major road at the distance of less than 1 km is Sohagara-Nainijor-Guthani Road. Nearest river to this village on western side at a distance of about 2 km is Chhoti Gandak which is a tributary of Ghaghara River and both rivers meet near Guthani. Geographically, this village is situated at coordinates of  26°13′13.6" North and 84°01'52.4" East.

Demographics 
As of 2011 census of India, the number of families (houses) residing in this village is 164. The Bakulari village has population of 1008 of which 480 are males while 528 are females as per Population Census 2011. This village has 137 children (Boys-65, Girls-72) in the age group of 0–6 years which makes up 13.59% of total population of village. Average Sex Ratio of Bakulari village is 1100 which is higher than Bihar state average of 918 which is good statistic. Child Sex Ratio for the Bakulari as per census is 1108, higher than Bihar average of 935. It is one of the 102 villages of Guthani Block of Siwan district.

Education 
Bakulari village is good in terms of education. As of 2011 census of India, Bakulari village has higher literacy rate compared to Bihar. In 2011, literacy rate of this village was 71.87% compared to 61.80% of Bihar. The male literacy stands at 81.20% while female literacy rate was 63.38%. This village has a very old and famous school of Guthani Block namely "राजकीय मध्य विद्यालय - बकुलारी (Govt. Middle School - Bakulari)", which was founded in 1951, but this school is now upgraded from Middle School (up to 8th standard) to Secondary School Certificate (up to 10th standard). Now this school provides for Secondary Education to the students not only of this village but also of its various neighbouring villages. Addition to this, many people of this village are well educated like Graduates and Post-Graduates in Arts, Engineering, Literature and Science. There is also a Post Office with PIN Code 841239.

Employment, culture, society and its people 
The local languages are Bhojpuri and Hindi as well. There are people of various castes like Brahmins, Baitha (Dhobi), Gond, Rajbhar, Ram (Harijan), Rawat (Bari) etc. along with only 'one family' of Muslim religion in this village. Despite such a great diversity, there is 'fraternity and brotherhood' among the residents. There are some temples of Hindu deities like Goddesses Maa Kali and Chanki, Lord Hanuman and Lord Shiva. The number of employed people of Bakulari village is more than 150 working in Govt. sectors like Indian Railways, Teaching, Defence etc., Private sectors including their own businesses and also working in Indian and Foreign companies as well. The major section of this village is also dependent on agriculture for its livelihood. The agriculture includes farming like cultivation of paddy, wheat, millets, maize etc. and domestication of animals. The major sports played by the youth of this village are cricket and football. The name of the cricket team of this village is "Sadhu Baba Cricket Club, Bakulari".

Nearest railway stations and towns

Neighbouring villages 
There are a lot of nearby villages like Sohagara, Katghara (U.P.), Bishunpura, Kurmauli, Daraila, Sematar,  Khilwa, Tarawa Khurd, Puraina, Kharwaniya (U.P.) etc.

References 
 https://web.archive.org/web/20160911073055/http://postofficepincode.com/bihar/siwan/bkulari-pincode/

External links 
 http://siwan.bih.nic.in/

Villages in Siwan district
Siwan district